Bratislava, the capital city of Slovakia, is situated in Central Europe and it is located in the extreme south-west within Slovakia. The city borders Austria in the west and Hungary in the south making it the only national capital in the world to border two foreign countries. The state  border with the Czech Republic is only  distant. Bratislava lies on the foothills of the Little Carpathians mountains and the city straddles both banks of the Danube River. Geomorphologically the city covers the southern tip of the Záhorie Lowland, the entire range of the Devín Carpathians, small westernmost part of the Pezinok Carpahians and the northern tip of the Danubian Lowland.

The Danube crosses the city from the west to the south-east. The Middle Danube basin begins at Devín Gate in western Bratislava. Other rivers nearby are the Morava River, which forms the north-western border of the city and flows into the Danube at Devín, the Little Danube, and the Vydrica, which flows into the Danube at the borough of Karlova Ves. Some parts of Bratislava, particularly Devín and Devínska Nová Ves, are vulnerable to floods. New flood protection is being built on both banks.

The Carpathian mountain range begins in city territory with the Little Carpathians (Malé Karpaty). The area includes Bratislava Forest Park, which is popular with many Bratislavans and is part of the Little Carpathians Protected Landscape Area. The Záhorie and Danubian Lowlands are partly situated in the city.

The nearest towns and villages are: to the north Stupava, Borinka and Svätý Jur; to the east Ivanka pri Dunaji and Most pri Bratislave; to the south-east Rovinka, Dunajská Lužná and Šamorín; to the south Rajka (HU); and to the west Kittsee (AT), Hainburg an der Donau (AT) and Marchegg (AT).

Distances from selected European cities
Bratislava is situated: 62 km from Vienna; 196 km from Budapest; 324 km from Prague; 532 km from Warsaw; 569 km from Belgrade; 769 km from Zürich; 1005 km from Kyiv; 1266 km from Paris; 1273 km from Amsterdam;  1314 km from Rome; 1473 km from Istanbul; 1602 km from London; 1735 km from Stockholm; 1886 km from Athens; 2104 km from Moscow and 2261 km from Madrid.

Climate
Bratislava lies in the north temperate zone and has a continental climate with four distinct seasons. It is often windy with a marked variation between hot summers and cold, humid winters. Recently, the transitions from winter to summer and summer to winter have been rapid, with short autumn and spring periods and the weather is occasionally extreme, quickly changing its state. Snow occurs less frequently now than previously.

Annual sunshine: 1976.4 hours (5.4 hours/day)
Average annual temperature: 10 °C (50 °F)

Rivers and lakes in Bratislava
Twenty water streams originate in the area of Bratislava. Four rivers flow through the area of the city: Danube, Morava river, Little Danube and partially Malina.

In addition, 18 streams and 9 canals or canalized streams flow through the city. The following is their list in alphabetical order:

Antošov canal
Banský stream
Bystrický stream
Bystrička
Čierny stream
Dúbravský stream
Horná Sihoť
Chorvátske rameno
Jarovské rameno
Karloveské rameno
Mošonské rameno
Rusovské rameno
Dymolez
Chotárny stream
Kratina
Lamačský stream
Marianský stream
Mástsky stream
Mokrý potok (also called Mokrý jarok)
Na Pántoch
Pieskový stream
Račiansky stream (also called Račiansky canal)
Rakyta
Rusovský canal
Stará Mláka
Struha
Šúrsky canal
Uhliarka
Vajnorský canal
Vajnorský stream
Vápenický stream
Veľkolúcky stream
Vydrica

Panorama of the city

See also
 Boroughs and localities of Bratislava
 List of tallest buildings in Bratislava
 Parks and gardens in Bratislava

References

 
Geography of Slovakia